The following are international rankings of Afghanistan.

Cities

Kabul
Mercer Human Resource Consulting: Most expensive cities 2008, not ranked among top 143 cities
Population of urban area ranked 105

Demographics

Population ranked 43 out of 228 countries and territories
CIA World Factbook 2008 estimates Life expectancy ranked 208 out of 211 countries and territories
Total immigrant population ranked 137 out of 192 countries

Economy 

 IMD International: World Competitiveness Yearbook 2005, not ranked among top 60 economies 
 The Wall Street Journal: Index of Economic Freedom 2008, ranked x out of 157 countries
 The Economist: Quality-of-Life Index 2005, not ranked among top 111 countries
 World Economic Forum: Global Competitiveness Report 2008–2009, ranked x out of 125 countries

Environment

 Yale University Center for Environmental Law and Policy and Columbia University Center for International Earth Science Information Network: Environmental Sustainability Index, ranked x out of 146 countries

Geography

 Total area ranked x out of 233 countries

Globalization
KOF: Index of Globalization 2007, not ranked out of 122 countries
A.T. Kearney/Foreign Policy Magazine: Globalization Index 2006, not ranked out of 62 countries

Industry

Military

Center for Strategic and International Studies: active troops ranked 27 out of 166 countries

Political

 Transparency International: Corruption Perceptions Index 2008, ranked x out of 180 countries
 Reporters without borders: Worldwide press freedom index 2008, ranked x out of 173 countries
The Economist Democracy Index 2007, ranked x out of 167 countries

Society

 United Nations: Human Development Index 2007, ranked 174 out of 180 countries
 Save the Children: State of the World's Mothers report 2007, ranked x out of 110 countries
World Health Organization: suicide rate, ranked x out of 100 countries
University of Leicester Satisfaction with Life Index 2006, not ranked among top 178 countries

Technology
Brown University Taubman Center for Public Policy 2006: ranked x in online government services
Number of mobile phones in use ranked x
Number of broadband Internet users ranked x
Economist Intelligence Unit: E-readiness 2008, ranked x out of 45 countries
World Economic Forum Networked Readiness Index 2007–2008, ranked x out of 127 countries
United Nations: e-Government Readiness Index, 2008, ranked x out of 50 countries

Tourism

World Tourism Organization: World Tourism rankings 2007, ranked x

Transportation

Total rapid transit systems ranked x

See also
Lists of countries
Lists by country
List of international rankings

References

Afghanistan